Air Littoral was an airline based in France that operated from 1972 to 2004. The airline operated domestic services as well as a small amount of regional routes. The airline also operated feeder services on behalf of Air France.

History 
Air Littoral was founded in April 1972 and originally based at Montpellier - Méditerranée Airport in Montpellier. It started operations on 23 May 1972 with a Nice-Montpellier-Perpignan service.  In 1975 it was headquartered at Aérodrome du Castellet.

Over the years KLM, Euralair, Lufthansa and the SAir Group (Swissair), which sold their stake in 2001, all had ownership stakes in Air Littoral. A takeover failed in 2003 and the company was declared bankrupt. A number of groups considered taking over Air Littoral including Azzurra Air (which shortly after ceased operations due to its own financial difficulties), but none succeeded and the airline was closed down by the French authorities in February 2004.

By the moment of bankruptcy Air Littoral was operating a fleet of 17 CRJ-100s from bases in Nice, Montpellier, Paris (Orly) and Marseille, and was well known for the bright livery that its aircraft sported in the years before its demise.

Fleet 

In different periods of its history the company was operating the following aircraft:
 ATR 42;
 ATR 72;
 Beechcraft 1900;
 Boeing 737-300;
 Bombardier CRJ;
 Embraer EMB 110 Bandeirante (4);
 Embraer EMB 120 Brasilia;
 Fairchild Swearingen Metroliner;
 Fokker F27 Friendship;
 Fokker 70;
 Fokker 100;
 Nord 262.

Accidents

References

External links

 
Air Littoral - Airlines Remembered

Defunct airlines of France
Airlines established in 1972
Airlines disestablished in 2004
French companies established in 1972
French companies disestablished in 2004